Philemon M. Utley (October 23, 1889 – June 16, 1950) was an American football, basketball, baseball, and track coach. He served as the head football coach at Carson–Newman University in 1913 and Lenoir–Rhyne University in 1921, compiling a career college football coaching record of 9–5. He coached the Wake Forest University men's basketball team in 1922–23 and the Demon Deacons baseball team in 1923. Utley also coached track at Wake Forest and served as the school athletic director in 1922–23.

A native of Raleigh, North Carolina, Utley attended Wake Forest from 1909 to 1913, where he played football as a quarterback and end, basketball as a guard, and baseball as a first baseman.  He was also a hurdler and shot putter in track. Utley died unexpectedly on June 16, 1950, in Los Angeles, California.

References

External links
 

1889 births
1950 deaths
American football ends
American football quarterbacks
American male hurdlers
American male shot putters
American men's basketball coaches
American men's basketball players
Baseball first basemen
Guards (basketball)
Carson–Newman Eagles football coaches
Lenoir–Rhyne Bears baseball coaches
Lenoir–Rhyne Bears football coaches
Lenoir–Rhyne Bears men's basketball coaches
Wake Forest Demon Deacons athletic directors
Wake Forest Demon Deacons baseball coaches
Wake Forest Demon Deacons baseball players
Wake Forest Demon Deacons football players
Wake Forest Demon Deacons men's basketball coaches
Wake Forest Demon Deacons men's basketball players
Wake Forest Demon Deacons men's track and field athletes
Wake Forest Demon Deacons track and field coaches
Players of American football from Raleigh, North Carolina
Baseball players from Raleigh, North Carolina
Basketball coaches from North Carolina
Basketball players from Raleigh, North Carolina
Track and field athletes from Raleigh, North Carolina